Alexandra Neil (born April 7, 1955) is an American stage, film and television actress. She is also an activist – co-founder of Downtown Women for Change in NYC.

Life and career 
Neil was born in Boston, Massachusetts. She attended middle school and high school at University-Liggett School in Grosse Pointe, MI. She graduated Cum Laude from Williams College in 1977 with a BA in English/Theatre. She also attended the National Theatre  Institute in 1975. She has worked in television, film, and theatre. She is also a playwright, director and acting teacher. She lives in New York City.

Neil made her Broadway debut in Match, (opposite Frank Langella) and played Candida in the Broadway production of Tom Stoppard’s Rock’n’Roll.

Film credits include: Listen Up Phillip, The Longest Week, Simon Killer, Afterschool, Twelve, nonames, Something’s Gotta Give, and others.

Television: guest stars and guest leads on Madoff, The Blacklist, Forever, Blue Bloods, all the Law & Orders, Madigan Men, Ed, The Sopranos, Dudley and she is well-known for five major roles on daytime drama, including Ruby Wright Wheeler on Texas.

Neil is a member of the Actors Center Workshop Company in NYC. She is included in the 2012 book Now you tell me! – 12 Actors Give the Best Advice They Never Got, by Sheridan Scott and Chris Willman.

Her play Moucheron was read in the Miranda Theatre Company’s Liz Smith Reading Series at the Cherry Lane in March 2019. Her play Strange Fits was read at the Atlantic Theater in 2009, and done in workshop in 2010 at New York Stage and Film.

She has directed her original work at the Williams College Summer Theater Lab, Williams College Theater, the Friday Series at Michael Howard Studios, and the NY Poetry Project.

Neil has taught acting at The Freeman Studio, Michael Howard Studios, NYU Tisch, the National Theater Institute, the Williams College Summer Theater Lab, the MFA Acting Program at Brooklyn College, Connecticut College, and Marymount College.

Activism 
In 2016, Neil co-founded (with writer and chef Eugenia Bone) the organization Downtown Women for Change in New York City. DWC is a grassroots organization committed to preserving and advancing women's rights, mentoring women who choose careers in public policy, and working to elect pro-choice, Democratic women and allies to city, state and national office.

Stage credits

Broadway 

 Rock’n’Roll (Tom Stoppard — 2010) – as Candida (also u/s Eleanor/Esme) – Dir: Trevor Nunn
 Match (Stephen Belber — 2004) – as Lisa – (u/s and played) – Dir: Nicholas Martin

Off and Off-Off Broadway 

 Reparations (2019) – Billie Holiday Theatre, as Ginny Pleasance
 Mystery of Love and Sex (2015) – Mitzi Newhouse Theatre at Lincoln Center, as Lucinda (u/s)
 An Oak Tree (2007) – Barrow Street Theatre, as The Father
 Marien’s Kammer (1985) – Ensemble Studio Theatre Marathon, as Marie
 The Cruelties of Mrs. Schnayd (1984) – NY Theatre Studio, as Madeleine
 Asian Shade (1983) – WPA Theatre, as Jean
 The Matchmaker (1980) – Jewish Repertory Theatre, as Ermengarde
 Rocket to the Moon (1979) – Jewish Repertory Theatre, as Cleo Singer
 Clear the Range (1979) – Theatre at St. Clements, as The Girl
 Sexy St. James (1979) – LaMama ETC, as Arden Amici
 The Ride Across Lake Constance (1978) – Theatre at St. Clements, as Elisabeth Bergner
 Four Little Girls (1978) — SoHo Rep, as Marie

Regional 

 Stag's Leap (2019) – Martha’s Vineyard Playhouse
 20th Century Blues (Susan Miller – 2018 – World Premiere) CATF, as Sil
 Now or Later (Christopher Shinn – 2012 – US Premiere) – Huntington Theatre Co., as Jessica
 In (Bess Wohl – 2011 – World Premiere) – Pioneer Theatre, as Pammie
 Balm in Gilead (1987) – Alley Theatre, Houston, as Darlene
 Of Mice and Men (1987) –Syracuse Stage, as Curley’s Wife
 Old Sins, Long Shadows (1986) – Philadelphia Theatre Company, as Delorah
 Sweet Bird of Youth (1985) – Cincinnati Playhouse in the Park, as Heavenly
 Bus Stop (1982) – Actors Theatre of Louisville, as Cherie
 The Resistable Rise of Arturo Ui (1980) – Hartman Theatre, as Dockdaisy

Filmography

Film 

 Listen Up Philip (2014) – Chelsea
 The Longest Week (2014) — Maribel Valmont
 Pretty Happy (2010) — Cheryl Jacobs
 Nonames (2010) – Mrs. Ellis
 Twelve (2010) – Mimi Kenton
 Afterschool (2008) – Gloria Talbert
 508 Nelson (2006) – Tammy Millar
 Marci X (2003) – Woman at Auction
 The Science of Love (2003 short) – Ileana
 Something's Gotta Give (2003) – Harry's Old Flame
 Suits (1999) – Sally Parkyn
 Longtime Companion (1989) – Soap Actress
 See No Evil, Hear No Evil (1989) – Sally
 Wall Street (1987) – Elevator Person
 Manhunter (1986) – Eileen

Television 

 Prodigal Son – “Wait & Hope” (2020) as Connie
 Blue Bloods – “Thicker Than Water” (2018) as Joan McCandless
 Madoff (2016)
 “Redemptions” (2016) as Monica Noel
 “Fallout” (2016) as Monica Noel
 “Catch Me If You Cancer” (2016) as Monica Noel
 “Millions to Billions” (2016) as Monica Noel
 Forever (2014)... New York Kids (2014) as Beth Forester *
 The Blacklist – “The Kingmaker” (2014) as Ginny Mitchell
 Law & Order: Criminal Intent – “Playing Dead” (2009) as Josie Hayes-Fitzgerald
 Law & Order (1997-2009)
 “Lucky Stiff” (2009) as Patricia Klein
 “Ego” (2001) as Alice Marner
 “Shadow” (1997) as Lisa Harmon
 One Life to Live (2004-2007) as Paige Miller (71 episodes)
 One Life to Live (1985-1985) as Jeannie Johnson (24 Episodes)
 Law & Order: Special Victims Unit – “Taboo” (2006) as Mrs. Drake
 All My Children (2002-2003) as Casey Wexler (16 episodes)
 Ed – “New School” (2003) as Mandel's attorney
 Madigan Men – “Meet the Wolfes” (2000) as Catherine
 The Sopranos—“A Hit Is a Hit” (1999) as Wendy Krim
 As The World Turns (1992-1994) as Dawn Wheeler (47 episodes)
 Dudley – unaired pilot (1992) as Sheila
 Guiding Light (1987-1989) as Rose McLaren Shayne (94 episodes)
 Another World (1984-1985) as Dr. Emily Benson (78 episodes)
 The Edge of Night (1984) as Mary Louise
 Search for Tomorrow (1984) as Gwen
 Sessions (1983) as Josh's girlfriend
 Texas (1980-1982) as Ruby Wright (187 episodes)
 Ryan's Hope (1978-1979) as Poppy Lincoln / Teresa Donahue (71 episodes)

References

External links

 
 Alexandra Neil profile - SoapCentral.com
 Alexandra Neil profile - ABC.com
 Clips from Texas episodes
 

1955 births
American film actresses
American soap opera actresses
American television actresses
Living people
Williams College alumni
Actresses from Boston
20th-century American actresses
21st-century American actresses
Brooklyn College faculty